Świniary Małe  (German: Klein Blumenau) is a village in the administrative district of Gmina Wołczyn, within Kluczbork County, Opole Voivodeship, in south-western Poland.

For the history of the region, see Upper Silesia.

References

Villages in Kluczbork County